Brock Peters (born George Fisher; July 2, 1927 – August 23, 2005) was an American actor and singer, best known for playing the villainous "Crown" in the 1959 film version of Porgy and Bess, and the wrongfully convicted Tom Robinson in the 1962 film To Kill a Mockingbird. Notable film roles include Carmen Jones (1954), The Pawnbroker (1964), Soylent Green (1973) and Ghosts of Mississippi (1996). He received the Screen Actors Guild Life Achievement Award in 1991 and a star on Hollywood Walk of Fame in 1992. 

He made his Broadway debut in the 1965 Norman Rosten play Mister Johnson. He was nominated for a Tony Award and won a Drama Desk Award and an Outer Critics Circle Award for his lead role as Rev. Stephen Kumalo in the 1972 Broadway revival of the musical Lost in the Stars. 

In the 1980s and 1990s, he voiced the role of Darth Vader in the serial radio drama adaptations of the original trilogy of Star Wars films, and played two recurring roles in the Star Trek franchise: Starfleet Admiral Cartwright in two of the original-cast feature films, and Joseph Sisko (father of station commander Benjamin Sisko) in Star Trek: Deep Space Nine.

Early life
Peters was born George Fisher in New York City, the son of Alma A. (née Norford) and Sonnie Fisher, a Senegalese  sailor with the French Navy. Peters set his sights on a show business career early on, at the age of 10. Avidly encouraged by his mother Alma to pursue a musical career, he studied the violin from 10 to 14 years of age, but he found out that his singing talents were more prodigious and upon enrolling at New York's famed High School of Music & Art, he immediately signed up for several productions in its musical theatre program. Upon graduation, Peters initially fielded more odd jobs than acting jobs, often working as a hospital orderly at night while he worked his way through physical education studies at the City College of New York (CCNY), but he still stayed connected to the burgeoning theatre and creative community in New York, occasionally doing background parts in musical plays like "Black Aida".

Career
After auditioning and landing a spot touring with the Leonard DePaur Infantry Chorus (of which he was a civilian member from 1945 to 1947), however, he officially quit CCNY. Peters often joked that he "grew up" in the chorus, because his vocal range changed from baritone to bass baritone during his years with them. DePaur subsequently gave him the lead in the Chorus' popular rendition of "John Henry" (which became a repertoire mainstay of Peters in later years, singing the work on one of his two solo albums which was produced by United Artists Records in the 1960s).

At the suggestion of his agent, he adopted a more memorable stage name, reversing the order of the names of childhood friend Peter Brock.

After auditioning and landing a stage role in the touring company of Porgy and Bess in 1949 on contralto Etta Moten's suggestion, he went on tour with the opera, where William Warfield commended his performances and requested that Peters be his understudy as Porgy. It was during this time while he was touring in Europe with the opera that Paul Robeson saw him in his career-defining role as "Crown" and purportedly declared that he was "a young Paul Robeson".

 Peters made his film debut in Carmen Jones in 1954, but began to make a name for himself in such films as To Kill a Mockingbird and The L-Shaped Room. He received a Tony nomination for his starring stint in Broadway's Lost in the Stars.

Peters sang background vocals on the 1956 hit "Day-O" by Harry Belafonte, as well as on Belafonte's 1957 hit, "Mama Look at Bubu". He led the chorus at recording sessions for Belafonte's iconic  1956 album Calypso. He also sang on the song "Where" from Randy Weston's 1959 album Live at the Five Spot and shared vocal duties with Martha Flowers on Weston's album of the following year, Uhuru Afrika.  During this time, Peters and Belafonte became close friends, sharing similar political views and approaches to their careers. In 1963, he played Matthew Robinson in Heavens Above!, a British satirical-comedy film starring Peter Sellers, directed by John and Roy Boulting. He played a supporting role as the gangster Rodriguez in the 1964 film, The Pawnbroker, one of the first confirmed homosexual characters in an American film. He played “Jesse” in a 1972 episode of Gunsmoke. He was a special guest star in the third season of The Streets of San Francisco, playing the character "Jacob" in the episode called "Jacob's Boy" (1974).

In the film Abe Lincoln, Freedom Fighter (1978), Peters plays Henry, a freed black slave who is falsely accused of robbery but, defended by Abraham Lincoln, is found not guilty due to the fact he has a damaged hand and could not have committed the crime. In To Kill a Mockingbird, Peters plays Tom Robinson, a black man falsely accused of raping a white girl, a crime Atticus Finch shows he could not have committed because his left hand and arm were damaged. In 1970 Peters portrayed the voice of African-American boxer Jack Johnson in Bill Cayton's film of the same name, and it is in this role that he can be heard at the end of Miles Davis' soundtrack album, Jack Johnson, saying: "I'm Jack Johnson. Heavyweight champion of the world. I'm black. They never let me forget it. I'm black, all right. I'll never let them forget it."

Between 1981 and 1996, Peters lent his bass voice of Darth Vader for the radio adaptations of the first three Star Wars films for National Public Radio. He also played the role of a Colonial prosecutor trying to make a murder case against Starbuck in an episode of the original Battlestar Galactica.

Peters appeared in the films Star Trek IV: The Voyage Home and Star Trek VI: The Undiscovered Country as Fleet Admiral Cartwright of Starfleet Command. Peters portrayed Joseph Sisko, father of Deep Space Nine's commanding officer, Benjamin Sisko, on Star Trek: Deep Space Nine. In 1993, he was a member of the jury at the 43rd Berlin International Film Festival. In early 2005, six months before his death, Peters guest-starred in an episode of JAG during its final season, "Bridging the Gulf", season 10 episode 15. Peters worked with Charlton Heston on several theater productions in the 1940s and 1950s. The two became friends and subsequently worked together on several films, including Major Dundee, Soylent Green, and Two-Minute Warning. He voiced Lucius Fox in several episodes of Batman: The Animated Series and Morris Grant/Soul Power in the animated series Static Shock (2000–2004).

He was involved in many community projects, including being chairman and a co-founder of the Dance Theatre of Harlem.

Recognition
Brock was awarded the 26th Screen Actors Guild Life Achievement Award in 1990 for his acting career and humanitarian contributions. He was given a star on the Hollywood Walk of Fame in the live theater category in 1992.

Personal life and death
Peters was once romantically involved with actress Ja'net Dubois. Peters was married to Dolores 'DiDi' Daniels from 1961 until her death in 1989. Their daughter Lisa Jo Peters was born November 3, 1962. Peters delivered the eulogy at Gregory Peck's funeral in 2003. His character, Tom Robinson, was defended by Peck's Atticus Finch in 1962's To Kill a Mockingbird. He died in Los Angeles from complications from pancreatic cancer on August 23, 2005, at the age of 78. Peters is buried in the Revelation section at Hollywood Hills Forest Lawn Cemetery, in Los Angeles, CA.

Filmography

Film

 Carmen Jones (1954) – Sergeant Brown
 Porgy and Bess (1959) – Crown
 The L-Shaped Room (1962) – Johnny
 To Kill a Mockingbird (1962) – Tom Robinson
 Heavens Above! (1963) – Matthew Robinson
 The Pawnbroker (1964) – Rodriguez
 Major Dundee (1965) – Aesop
 The Incident (1967) – Arnold Robinson
 PJ (1968) – Waterpark
 Daring Game (1968) – Jonah
 Ace High (1968) – Thomas
 The McMasters (1970) – Benjie
 Black Girl (1972) – Earl
 Soylent Green (1973) – Lieutenant Hatcher
 Slaughter's Big Rip-Off (1973) – Reynolds
 Lost in the Stars (1974) – Reverend Stephen Kumalo
 Framed (1975) – Sam Perry
 Two-Minute Warning (1976) – Los Angeles Memorial Coliseum security chief Paul
 Abe Lincoln: Freedom Fighter (1978) – Henry
 Samson and Delilah (1986, animated short) – (voice)
 Star Trek IV: The Voyage Home (1986) – Fleet Admiral Cartwright
 Alligator II: The Mutation (1991) – Chief Speed
 Star Trek VI: The Undiscovered Country (1991) – Fleet Admiral Cartwright
 The Importance of Being Earnest (1992) – Doctor Chasuble
 Ghosts of Mississippi (1996) – Walter Williams
 Believe (1996, Short)
 Two Weeks from Sunday (1997, Short)
 Park Day (1998) – Heseeit Turner
 The Last Place on Earth (2002) – Jack Field
 No Prom for Cindy (2002, Short) – Doctor
 The Wild Thornberrys Movie (2002) – Jomo (voice)

Television

 The Loner episode "The Homecoming of Lemuel Stove" (1956) - Ex-Union soldier Lemuel Stove
 The Snows of Kilimanjaro (1960)
 Gunsmoke (1969) – Cato
 Daniel Boone (1964) - Pompey
 Mission: Impossible (1967) The Money Machine-Walter Dubruis
 Mannix (1970) - Sonny Carter
 Welcome Home, Johnny Bristol (1972) – Berdahl
 Gunsmoke (1973) – Jesse Dillard
 Pomroy's People (1973) – Rev. Pomroy
 Rawhide (1965) – Phinn Harper
 SST: Death Flight (1977) – Dr. Therman
 Seventh Avenue (1977) – Sergeant Rollins
 The Million Dollar Dixie Deliverance (1978) – Zechariah
 The Incredible Journey of Doctor Meg Laurel (1979) – Joe
 A Bond of Iron (1979)
Battle Star Galactica - "Murder on the Rising Star" (1979) - Chief Opposer Solon
 The Adventures of Huckleberry Finn (1981) – Jim
 A House Divided: Denmark Vessey's Rebellion (1982)
 A Caribbean Mystery (1983) – Dr. Graham
 The Young and the Restless (1982-1985) - Detective Frank Lewis
 Faerie Tale Theatre (1985) - The Ogre
 Galtar and the Golden Lance (1985-1986) - Tormack (voice)
 Murder, She Wrote Episode titled: 'Trial by error' (1986)-Mr.Bently, Juror
 Broken Angel (1988) – Sgt. Mercurio
 To Heal a Nation (1988) – Paul Turner
 Polly (1989) – Mr. Pendergast
 Gravedale High (1990) - Boneyard (voice)
 The Great Los Angeles Earthquake (1990) – David Motubu
 The Pirates of Dark Water (1991-1993) - Bloth (voice)
 Highway Heartbreaker (1992) – Bert Quinn
 The Secret (1992) – Thurgood "Uncle T." Carver III
 You Must Remember This (1992) – Gus
 Batman: The Animated Series (1992-1994) - Lucius Fox (voice)
 SWAT Kats: The Radical Squadron (1993-1994) - Dark Kat (voice)
 Cosmic Slop (1994) – Minister Coombs
 An Element of Truth (1995)
 Star Trek: Deep Space Nine (1995-1998) - Joseph Sisko
 Samurai Jack: Jack, the Woolies and the Chritchellites (2001) - Lazzor (voice)
 10,000 Black Men Named George (2002) – Leon Frey
 The Locket (2002) – Henry McCord
 Static Shock (2003) – Morris Grant / Soul Power (voice)

Other notable performances
 Nat Turner in The Original Confessions of Nat Turner As Made to T.R. Gray, November 1, 1831, LP, CMS Records (1968)
 Stephen Kumalo in Kurt Weill and Maxwell Anderson's Lost in the Stars (stage revival and 1974 film version) – nominated for a Tony Award
 The Reverend Canon Frederick Chasuble, DD in an all-black film version of Oscar Wilde's The Importance of Being Earnest (1992)
 Darth Vader in the Star Wars radio series
 Voice-acting performance as the boxer Jack Johnson on the Miles Davis album A Tribute to Jack Johnson''

References

External links

 
 
 
 

 

1927 births
2005 deaths
Male actors from New York City
African-American male actors
American male film actors
American male television actors
American male musical theatre actors
American male radio actors
American male voice actors
Deaths from cancer in California
Deaths from pancreatic cancer
People from Harlem
Burials at Forest Lawn Memorial Park (Hollywood Hills)
The High School of Music & Art alumni
20th-century American singers
20th-century American male actors
20th-century American male singers
20th-century African-American male singers
21st-century African-American people